Lindsay Davenport was the defending champion, but lost against Chanda Rubin in the final, 5–7, 7–6(7–5), 6–3.

It was the 2nd title for Rubin in the season and the 5th title in her career.

Seeds
All seeds received a bye into the second round.

Draw

Finals

Top half

Section 1

Section 2

Bottom half

Section 3

Section 4

References
 Main and Qualifying Draws

2002 WTA Tour
LA Women's Tennis Championships